The Vicar of Wakefield is a 1916 British silent drama film directed by Fred Paul and starring Laura Cowie, A.E. George and John Hare. It is based on the 1766 novel The Vicar of Wakefield by Oliver Goldsmith. Prints and/or fragments were found in the Dawson Film Find in 1978.

Cast
 Laura Cowie - Olivia Primrose
 A.E. George - Jenkinson
 John Hare - Dr. Charles Primrose
 Marie Illington - Mrs. Primrose
 Martin Lewis - George Primrose
 Margaret Shelley - Sophia Primrose
 Mabel Twemlow - Miss Skeggs
 Ben Webster - Sir William
 Frank Woolf - Mr. Burchell

References

External links

1916 films
British silent feature films
1916 drama films
1910s English-language films
Films directed by Fred Paul
British drama films
Films based on Irish novels
British black-and-white films
Films about Catholic priests
1910s British films
Silent drama films